Heliodorowo  is a village in the administrative district of Gmina Szamocin, within Chodzież County, Greater Poland Voivodeship, in west-central Poland. As of the census of 2011, the village has population of 300.

References

Heliodorowo